Ice hockey at the 2023 European Youth Olympic Winter Festival comprised two ice hockey tournaments – a boys' under-17 tournament and a girls' under-16 tournament – during the Friuli-Venezia Giulia 2023 edition of the European Youth Olympic Festival (EYOF). Both tournaments were held during 22 to 27 January 2023. The boys' tournament was played in the Friuli-Venezia Giulia region of Italy at the Fiera di Udine in Udine and the girls' tournament was played at the Eissportarena in Spittal an der Drau, Austria, the only event of the festival to be held in Austria.

Medal summary

Medal table

Medalists

Boys' tournament

The boys' ice hockey tournament at the 2023 European Youth Olympic Winter Festival was held at the Fiera di Udine in the Parco del Cormòr of Udine, Italy during 22 to 27 January 2023. It was the fourteenth boys' ice hockey tournament to be played as part of a European Youth Olympic Winter Festival, since the sport's introduction to the programme at the 1997 European Youth Olympic Winter Days.

Only players born in either 2006 or 2007 were eligible to compete in the tournament and, therefore, all players were 15 or 16 years old at the start of the tournament. 

Switzerland went undefeated to claim their first EYOF ice hockey gold medal. First-time tournament medalists Lativa won silver and Finland rounded out the medal table with bronze. Germany, Slovakia, and tournament host Italy placed fourth, fifth, and sixth, respectively.

The Swiss team featured the top seven point scorers of the tournament: scoring leader Joel Grossniklaus, who scored 2 goals and 6 assists for 8 points; followed by Yannik Ponzetto and Loris Wey, who both tallied 7 points on 2 goals and 5 assists; Daniil Ustinkov, the tournament's top scoring defenseman, and Jordan Forget, who both notched a goal and 5 assists; David Bosson, who scored 4 goals and 1 assist; and Jamiro Reber, who recorded 3 goals and 2 assists. Reber tied with German Simon Seidl and Finn Aatu Karvinen for seventh on the points table, followed by Finland's Matvey Butkovskiy at tenth with 2 goals and 3 assists.

The leading scorers of those teams not represented in the top-ten of the points table were: Matthias Pardatscher (1+1) and Gianmarco Fraschetta (1+1) for Italy, Oskars Nils Briedis (0+5) for Latvia, and Pavol Prokopovič (1+4) for Slovakia.

Preliminary round

Group A

Group B

Play-off round

Semifinals

Fifth place game

Bronze medal game

Gold medal game

Awards
Best players selected by the Directorate

Girls' tournament

The girls' ice hockey tournament at the 2023 European Youth Olympic Winter Festival was held at the Eissportarena in Spittal an der Drau, Austria during 22 to 27 January 2023. It was the second girls' ice hockey tournament to be played as part of a European Youth Olympic Winter Festival, following the inaugural tournament at Vuokatti 2022.

Only players born in either 2007 or 2008 were eligible to compete in the tournament and, therefore, all players were 14 or 15 years old at the start of the tournament.

Slovakia placed first in Group A after losing only one game in the preliminary round, a 3–4 loss to Switzerland. The Czech Republic, defending gold medalists from 2022, were unbeaten in the preliminary round and topped the Group B standings to earn placement in their second consecutive gold medal game. The dominance of the Czech team continued as they outscored Slovakia 4–1 to remain the only team to have won EYOF gold in girls' ice hockey. Slovakia claimed their first EYOF girls' ice hockey medal with silver.

Finland narrowly missed placing first in Group A after amassing a win-loss record, goal differential, and points total indentical to that of Slovakia but, because their one loss came against Slovakia, were held to second place and progressed to their second consecutive bronze medal game. In the preliminary round rematch between the 2022 gold medal match teams, Sweden onceagain pushed the Czech Republic to overtime before ultimately losing in the shootout. With the overtime loss as the only blemish on their record, Sweden finished second in Group B. Continuing in dramatic fashion, Sweden tied the score against Finland in the last five minutes of regulation to push the bronze medal game to overtime. After a scoreless overtime period, Abigail Byskata scored the lone goal of the shootout to solidify Finland’s second consecutive bronze medal victory.

Austria and Italy both made their EYOF girls' ice hockey debuts in 2023, making the fifth place game a matchup between two tournament newcomers. Italy’s Federica Boaglio scored the only goal of the game, as Anna Corte Sualon earned a 42-shot shutout to capture a fifth place finish for the host nation.

Switzerland beat Germany 3–2 to claim seventh place.

Preliminary round

Group A
Standings

Results

Group B
Standings

Results

Final round

Seventh place game

Fifth place game

Bronze medal game

Gold medal game

Final standings

Source: EYOF 2023

Player statistics

Scoring leaders
Top-ten point scorers sorted by points, then goals.

GP = Games played; G = Goals; A = Assists; Pts = Points; +/− = Plus/minus; PIM = Penalties in minutes; POS = Position
Source: EYOF 2023

Goaltenders
Goaltenders who played at least 40% of their team's minutes are included in this list, sorted by save percentage.

TOI = Time on ice (minutes:seconds); SOG = Shots on goal; GA = Goals against; GAA = Goals against average; Sv% = Save percentage; SO = ShutoutsSource: EYOF 2023

Awards
Best players selected by the Directorate

Rosters

References

External links
Official results book – Ice Hockey – Boys
Official results book – Ice Hockey – Girls

2023 European Youth Olympic Winter Festival events
2022–23 in European ice hockey
Ice hockey at the European Youth Olympic Festival
International ice hockey competitions hosted by Austria
International ice hockey competitions hosted by Italy
Sport in Carinthia (state)